The Singapore women's national handball team is the national team of Singapore. It is governed by the Handball Federation Singapore and takes part in international handball competitions.

Asian Championship record
2018 – 9th
2021 – 9th

External links

IHF profile

Women's national handball teams
Hand